Great Red Dragon may refer to:

 Satan, in the Book of Revelation in the Bible
 The Great Red Dragon paintings, a series of paintings by William Blake
 Great Red Dragon, a persona of fictional character Francis Dolarhyde in Red Dragon by Thomas Harris
 Great Red Dragon, a fictional character from Bone comics
 "The Great Red Dragon" (Hannibal), an episode of the TV series
 "The Great Red Dragon", an episode of The Mentalist (season 6)

See also
 Red dragon (disambiguation)
 Dragon (disambiguation)
 List of dragons in popular culture

Book of Revelation
New Testament words and phrases